Dwayne Kemp (born 24 February 1988 in Rotterdam) is a Dutch baseball player for the Curaçao Neptunus of the Honkbal Hoofdklasse.

Career
On October 20, 2007, Kemp signed with the Chicago Cubs organization as an international free agent. Prior to signing with the team, Kemp had played with the DOOR Neptunus and Sparta-Feyenoord in the Honkbal Hoofdklasse, the Dutch Major Leagues. He made his professional debut in 2008 with the rookie-level AZL Cubs, and also played for the Low-A Boise Hawks, hitting a cumulative .227/.292/.375 with 1 home run and 9 RBI in 32 games. He returned to the AZL Cubs in 2009, where he slashed .248/.303/.416 with 1 home run and 12 RBI in 25 games. On March 28, 2010, Kemp was released by the Cubs organization. Kemp returned to the Neptunus, now known as the Curaçao Neptunus, following his release from the Cubs organization, with whom he has played for since.

International career
He has played for the Netherlands national baseball team at the 2011 Baseball World Cup, 2010 European Baseball Championship, 2011 Baseball World Cup, 2013 World Port Tournament, 2015 World Port Tournament, 2016 Haarlem Baseball Week, 2016 European Baseball Championship, and 2019 European Baseball Championship. He played for Team Netherlands in the Africa/Europe 2020 Olympic Qualification tournament in Italy in September 2019.

References

External links

 www.honkbalsite.com baseball profile

1988 births
2016 European Baseball Championship players
2017 World Baseball Classic players
2019 European Baseball Championship players
Arizona League Cubs players
Boise Hawks players
Curacao Neptunus players
DOOR Neptunus players
Dutch people of Aruban descent
Living people
Sparta-Feyenoord players
Sportspeople from Rotterdam
Sydney Blue Sox players
Dutch expatriate baseball players in Australia
Dutch expatriate baseball players in the United States